KDIT-CD (channel 45) is a low-power, Class A television station licensed to Marshalltown, Iowa, United States, broadcasting the digital multicast network Decades to the Des Moines area. The station is owned and operated by Weigel Broadcasting, and maintains a transmitter in Alleman, Iowa.

On July 29, 2021, it was reported that Weigel Broadcasting would purchase the then KDAO-CD for $195,000, pending approval of the Federal Communications Commission (FCC). The sale did not include the KDAO-CD call sign, which was retained by MTN Broadcasting. The sale was completed on September 28; and the callsign was changed to KDIT-CD on October 19.

Subchannels
The station's digital signal is multiplexed:

References

DIT-CD
Marshalltown, Iowa
Television channels and stations established in 1987
1987 establishments in Iowa
Decades (TV network) affiliates
Movies! affiliates
Low-power television stations in the United States
Weigel Broadcasting